Omsky (masculine), Omskaya (feminine), or Omskoye (neuter) may refer to:
Omsky District, a district of Omsk Oblast, Russia
Omsky (rural locality) (Omskaya, Omskoye), name of several rural localities in Russia
Omsk Oblast (Omskaya oblast), a federal subject of Russia